Leiocithara zamula is a species of sea snail, a marine gastropod mollusk in the family Mangeliidae.

Description
The length of the shell attains 5.5 mm, its diameter 2.5 mm.

Distribution
This species occurs off Transkei, South Africa, at depths between 160 m and 350 m.

References

 Kilburn R.N. 1992. Turridae (Mollusca: Gastropoda) of southern Africa and Mozambique. Part 6. Subfamily Mangeliinae, section 1. Annals of the Natal Museum, 33: 461–575

External links
  Tucker, J.K. 2004 Catalog of recent and fossil turrids (Mollusca: Gastropoda). Zootaxa 682:1–1295.

Endemic fauna of South Africa
zamula
Gastropods described in 1992